Kalle Kauppi (born 6 May 1992) is a Finnish footballer currently playing for Finnish club Åbo IFK.

References

External links
veikkausliiga.com Profile

1992 births
Living people
Finnish footballers
FC Inter Turku players
Veikkausliiga players
Turun Toverit players
Association football midfielders
People from Paimio
Sportspeople from Southwest Finland